Austyn Shortman (born 1972), is a male former swimmer who competed for England.

Swimming career
Shortman represented England and won two silver medals in the 4 x 100 metres freestyle relay and the 4 x 100 metres medley relay, at the 1990 Commonwealth Games in Auckland, New Zealand.

References

1972 births
English male swimmers
Swimmers at the 1990 Commonwealth Games
Commonwealth Games medallists in swimming
Commonwealth Games silver medallists for England
Living people
Medallists at the 1990 Commonwealth Games